Francesca Covali (born 8 June 2004) is a Moldovan footballer who plays as a defensive midfielder for Romanian Liga II club Farul Constanța and as a right back for the Moldova women's national team.

Club career
Covali has played for Real Succes in Moldova in her youth years and for Selena ȘN in Romania. Now is playing for Farul Constanta at Hagi Academy.

International career
Covali capped for Moldova at senior level during the 2023 FIFA Women's World Cup qualification (UEFA).

See also
 List of Moldova women's international footballers

References

External links
 
 

2004 births
Living people
Moldovan women's footballers
Women's association football fullbacks
Moldova women's international footballers
Moldovan expatriate women's footballers
Moldovan expatriate sportspeople in Romania
Expatriate women's footballers in Romania